Ann Goldstein may refer to:
Ann Goldstein (curator) (born 1957), American museum curator
Ann Goldstein (translator) (born 1949), American translator of Italian